The 8th People's Choice Awards, honoring the best in American popular culture for 1981, were held in 1982. They were broadcast on CBS.

Winners
Favorite All-Around Female Entertainer:
Barbara Mandrell

Favorite Country/Western Musical Performer:
Kenny Rogers

Favorite Female Musical Performer:
Barbara Mandrell

Favorite New Song:
"Endless Love"

Favorite TV Dramatic Program:
Dallas

Favorite Female TV Performer:
Barbara Mandrell

Favorite Young TV Performer:
Gary Coleman

Favorite Male Musical Performer:
Kenny Rogers

Favorite Overall New TV Program:
Hill Street Blues

Favorite TV Comedy Program:
M*A*S*H

Favorite Male TV Performer:
Alan Alda

Favorite New TV Dramatic Program:
Hill Street Blues

Favorite TV Special:
Bob Hope

Favorite Male Performer in a New TV Program:
James Garner

Favorite Motion Picture:
Raiders of the Lost Ark

Favorite Female Performer in a New TV Program:
Linda Evans

Favorite Motion Picture Actor:
Burt Reynolds

Favorite Motion Picture Actress:
Sally Field,
Jane Fonda

Favorite New TV Comedy Program:
Private Benjamin

Favorite All-Around Male Entertainer:
Burt Reynolds

References

People's Choice Awards
1981 awards
1982 in American television
1981 awards in the United States
March 1982 events in the United States